Argenbühl is a municipality in the district of Ravensburg, Baden-Württemberg, Germany.

No actual town or urban settlement is called Argenbühl; rather, the municipality is an administrative amalgamation of several neighbouring villages with different names. The municipal administrative headquarters are located in the village of Eisenharz, with local branch offices also in the villages of Christazhofen, Eglofs, and Ratzenried.

Geographically, it lies in the western part of the Prealpine region of the Allgäu, which in turn is part of the larger geographical region of Swabia in southern Germany. Argenbühl borders the municipalities of Kißlegg and Leutkirch im Allgäu to the north, Wangen im Allgäu to the west, Isny im Allgäu to the east, and the Bavarian municipalities of Hergatz, Heimenkirch, Röthenbach (Allgäu), and Gestratz to the south.

The name comes from the Argen River, whose two main constituent streams delimit part of the municipality's borders, and Bühl, which is a Southern German word for "hill", reflecting the municipality's hilly landscape.

Geography 

Argenbühl lies at an altitude from 662 to 761 m (2172 to 2497 ft) AMSL, between the cities of Wangen and Isny.

The municipality includes the following settlements (2006 population data):

 Christazhofen (943 inhabitants, 15.44 km² / 5.96 mi2)
 Eglofs (1496 inhabitants, 23.40 km² / 9.03 mi2)
 Eisenharz (1446 inhabitants, 13.38 km² / 5.17 mi2)
 Göttlishofen (490 inhabitants, 7.22 km² / 2.79 mi2)
 Ratzenried (1171 inhabitants, 13.77 km² / 5.32 mi2)
 Siggen (171 inhabitants, 3.17 km² / 1.22 mi2)

History 

The municipality of Argenbühl has existed since 1 January 1972, when the previously independent municipalities of Christazhofen, Eglofs, Eisenharz, Göttlishofen, Ratzenried, and Siggen were merged into the present one. Their history is told in great detail in the Description of the Wangen Administrative District (Beschreibung des Oberamts Wangen), published in 1841. In 1810, all the above-mentioned communities came under the jurisdiction of the Wangen district, which in 1973 became part of the Ravensburg district.

Religion 

Argenbühl has six Roman Catholic parishes. The region's few Lutheran followers attend their church in nearby Wangen im Allgäu.

Politics

Municipal council 
The election for the municipal council (Gemeinderat) on 7 June 2009 had the following results:
CDU 68.6% - 12 seats (-1)
Independent 31.4% - 5 seats (+2)

Sister towns 
  Capannoli, Italy
  Cieszanów, Poland
  Berbisdorf (part of Radeburg, Saxony), Germany

Economy and infrastructure

Transport 
The municipality is linked by bus lines to neighbouring cities, such as Leutkirch, Isny, and Wangen. The lines are operated by the Lake Constance-Upper Swabia Local Transport Administration (Bodensee-Oberschwaben Verkehrsverbund), popularly known as bodo. In the past, a stop of the Kißlegg–Hergatz railway branch was in Ratzenried.

Education 
Eglofs and Ratzenried have each an elementary and a general secondary school (Hauptschule) that also works as a Werkrealschule. In Christazhofen and Eisenharz  are only elementary schools. Four kindergartens also are in the municipality.

Culture and sights

Museums 

The village of Ratzenried has a local history museum, while Eglofs hosts the Allgäu-Swabian Music Archive (Allgäu-Schwäbische Musikarchiv). In 2009, a museum was also opened in Eisenharz, with exhibits about the history of the place and the local dairy industry of the Wunderlich and Nestlé companies.

Notable buildings 

 The Eglofs Baroque church is part of the Upper Swabian Baroque Route (Oberschwäbische Barockstraße).
 The castle at Ratzenried is the administrative headquarters of the Humboldt-Institut language school conglomerate.
 The Round Chapel of Eisenharz is a medieval chapel that is the destination of a yearly Boxing Day Catholic procession.

Notable people 

 Gebhard of Razenried (1583–1652), Jesuit priest, rector of the Eichstätt Jesuit College from 1621–1631 and from 1637 of the Augsburg college
 Konstantin Rösch (1869–1944), theologian
 Anton Kulmus (1900-1989), developer and manufacturer of agricultural vehicles
 Anton Morent (1924–2006), transportation entrepreneur
 Helmut Maucher (1927-2018), former CEO of Nestlé

See also
Meggen Lawn Cross

References

Ravensburg (district)